Nicola Macleod (born 14 May 1997) is a South African water polo player. She competed in the 2020 Summer Olympics.

References

1997 births
Living people
Sportspeople from Johannesburg
Water polo players at the 2020 Summer Olympics
South African female water polo players
Olympic water polo players of South Africa
University of Cape Town alumni
20th-century South African women
21st-century South African women